The Inner-City Games were founded by Daniel Hernandez of the Hollenbeck Youth Center in 1991 as a way to build self-confidence, self-reliance, and camaraderie among inner-city youth. The Games began in East Los Angeles with more than 40,000 youths competing in athletic and academic competitions. In the wake of the LA riots in 1992, Hernandez envisioned the Games expanding citywide and then nationally. Hernandez shared this vision with Arnold Schwarzenegger who agreed to be the Games Executive Commissioner. In 1995, the National Inner-City Games Foundation was established. Under the national umbrella, the Games have expanded to 15 cities across the United States and involved more than one million young people across the country. In 2003, the Inner-City Games was renamed to After-School All-Stars; however in Los Angeles they remained the Inner-City Games.

References

External links
Founding agency

Organizations based in Los Angeles
Community-building organizations
Charities based in California
After school programs
Sports charities